Season one of Make Me a Supermodel, an American reality television series based on the British series of the same name, premiered on January 10, 2008, on the Bravo television network.

Casting director Jennifer Starr joined the season 1 cast along with Cory Bautista, director of New York Model Management, as judges. Tyson Beckford and Niki Taylor played as both judges and the hosts of the show.

A casting special aired prior to the season opener on January 2, 2008, featuring many models being photographed, critiqued on the runway, and sent away until only the final choices for the season remained.

The winner of the competition, chosen by the viewers, would receive: a fashion pictorial in GQ Magazine, a cash prize of $100,000, and a one-year contract with New York Model Management.

The winner of the competition was 21-year-old Holly Kiser from Coeburn, Virginia.

Contestants
''(ages stated are at time of contest)

Contestant elimination progress

 Note: The bottom three contestants chosen for the public vote are shown at the end of each episode, and the eliminated model is shown at the beginning of the following episode.

 Cornflower blue background and "WIN" means the model won the challenge.
 Light blue background and "HIGH" means the model had one of the highest scores for that challenge.
 Pink background and "LOW" means the model had one of the lowest scores for that challenge, but was not in the bottom three.
 Orange background and "BTM3" means the model was in the bottom three, and may have been given another chance by America to stay in the competition.
 Dark orange background and "BTM2" means the model was in the bottom two, and may have been given another chance by America to stay in the competition.
 Tomato background and "OUT" means the model was in the bottom three, but was not given another chance by America, and was sent home.
 Light green background and "FINALIST" means the Final 4 were placed in the hands of America to make one of the four a supermodel.
 Yellow Green background and "OUT" means the model was a runner-up for the competition.
 Lime Green background and "WINNER" means the model won the entire competition, and was voted by America to become a supermodel.
Note: In Episode 10, only two people were in the bottom.
Episode 12 was a reunion for the top four to look back with the eliminated contestants.

Episodes

Photo shoots

Episode 1: Summer clothes in frigid weather in Times Square, New York City.
Episode 2: Suits and dresses while fitted with harnesses and suspended from the ceiling.
Episode 3: Sexual chemistry involving pairs, regardless of gender.
Episode 4: A ten-minute still posing as nude models for an art class in Parsons; group shots with one male among a group of females, and vice versa; then, getting full body paint to act as a group for a living art installation.
Episode 5: There were no photo shoots for the week, as the episode concentrated on catwalk in New York Fashion Week.
Episode 6: The use of emotions and body language to act out a scene; done in groups of three.
Episode 7: Submerged in a tank of water, and posing with an albino snake.
Episode 8: A winter-themed photo shoot done in the snow, emphasizing speed, action, and motion; done in groups of twos or threes.
Episode 9: Instead of an actual photo shoot, the models participated in a sensual online video lookbook for Marithé + François Girbaud, with each scene done in a pair or a group of three; then, acting as brand ambassadors for the label Bloomingdales, at a customer luncheon.
Episode 10: The models were flown off to New Orleans and were assigned with a high fashion photo shoot with a dramatic Goth theme, set in a local cemetery.
Episode 11: For their final photo assignment, the models took a nude photo session with Matthew Rolston, and each one represented a different classical element. Holly was fire, Perry was water, Ronnie was earth, and Ben was air. The photos were then displayed in a gallery to showcase the models' performances to the judges and the public.
Episode 13: Though not an actual photo assignment, the models spent their final day going on New York designer go-sees.

Catwalk challenges

Episode 1: Swimwear, with two men and two women wearing thongs.
Episode 2: Wearing designs from Heatherette, and embodying fun and attitude.
Episode 3: Walking in pairs with their partner in the Sexual Chemistry photo shoot, wearing a mix of equestrian and S&M clothing.
Episode 4: Wearing high fashion from British designers, posing as statues at each end of the runway.
Episode 5: The contestants were given runway assignments in New York Fashion Week.  This is separate from the "New York downtown grunge" catwalk challenge they did during judging.
Episode 6: Walking in pairs (or solo in Jacki's case), while performing a story based on characters they have selected.
Episode 7: Donning enormous quirky headpieces, and walking down the runway with an animal, such as sheep, pigs, ducks, peacocks, and dogs.
Episode 8: Walking down the runway leading to a turntable at the end, and posing once after each turntable rotation, three times, before departing the turntable.
Episode 9: Wearing two sophisticated vintage looks (therefore doing the catwalk twice), and capturing the timeless elegance of both looks from each of their respective eras.
Episode 10: The models choreographed their own fashion show with a gothic and dark theme, while each model portrayed a different character in the plot of a story. Each model walked multiple times, with props.
Episode 11: For their final catwalk assignment, the models displayed three looks/styles on the runway: underwear/sexy, preppy/fun, and formal/somber. Project Runway season 4 winner Christian Siriano makes a special guest appearance as the models' runway coach and stylist, and created a special dress for Holly to wear on the runway, as her "fun" look.
Episode 13: For their farewell runway walk before the announcement of the season winner, the boys wore metallic-colored suits while Holly was dressed as a "couture butterfly" in a red ball gown.

Post-show careers

Stephanie Bulger signed with New York Model Management - Division: nym2 - Women, and L.A. Models.
Katy Caswell signed with Chi-Town Modeling Agency.
Ben DiChiara signed with New York Model Management - Division: Men. He left the industry to start working in the Nashville Fire Department. He and his wife's expected their first baby was born on October 2009.
Frankie Godoy signed with Why Not Model Agency in Milan, Italy - Division: Man, Out of Town.
Jacki Hydock signed with Bloom Model Management - Division: Women, Request Model Management - Division: Women.
Holly Kiser signed with New York Model Management - Division: Women, L.A. Model Management - Division: Women,  Connected Models in Hong Kong, China - Division: Women, and Red Eleven - Division: Women
Ronnie Kroell signed with New York Model Management - Division: Men.
Aryn Livingston signed with New York Model Management - Division: nym2 - Women.
Jay McGee signed with MC2 Model Management in Miami, D1 Models in London (as Jerry McGee), and Click Model Management in Atlanta.
Shannon Pallay signed with New York Model Management - Division: Women.
Dominic Prietto  signed with Imodel and talent. - Division: i Men L.A.
Casey Skinner signed with New York Model Management - Division: Men.
Perry Ullmann signed with New York Model Management - Division: Men, and L.A. Model Management - Division: Men. He died the 15th January 2021.

References

External links
 
 Season Homepage

2008 American television seasons
Modeling-themed reality television series